José Gabriel González (born 31 July 1978) is a Swedish indie folk singer-songwriter and guitarist from Gothenburg. González is also a member of the band Junip, along with Tobias Winterkorn.

Early life and education 
The González family – made up of González's father, a National University of San Luis psychology student, González's mother, a fellow student studying biochemistry, both of whom were politically active, and González's older sister, then an infant – fled Argentina after the military coup d'état in March 1976, at the start of the "Dirty War". Escaping to Brazil, they were granted asylum by the Swedish consulate in Rio de Janeiro, and relocated to Gothenburg in 1977. José was born a year later, in the Haga district of Gothenburg. He has a younger sibling. He commented, "It's a very small town. It has about a half-million people living there. It's a pretty good music city by the ocean. It rains a lot there, but it's beautiful in the summertime."

González grew up listening to Latin folk and pop music and has named Cuban singer-songwriter Silvio Rodríguez as a favourite artist. He said the first concert he went to was The Wailers. "I got their autographs and everything," he said in an interview. "I was about 12 or so. At the time, my favourite music was Bob Marley and Michael Jackson."

González was in a PhD program for biochemistry at the University of Gothenburg. In 2003, he stopped working on the PhD, as his musical career became a new focus.

Career 
The first band he played in was Back Against the Wall, a Gothenburg hardcore punk band influenced by Black Flag, The Misfits and the Dead Kennedys. He later played bass guitar in another hardcore band, Renascence, between 1993 and 1998. Between 1997 and 1998 José played guitar with rock band Only if You Call Me Jonathan.

In June 2003 González released his debut solo release, a two-track  single. The single was discovered by Joakim Gävert, co-founder of the then fledgling label Imperial Records who then signed González as their first official artist. In October he released his debut album, Veneer, in Europe. The album was subsequently released in the UK on 25 April 2005, and in the United States on 6 September 2005. The album was made while González was a PhD student at the University of Gothenburg.

González' trademark sound is solo classical guitar with soft vocal melody. His work, although mostly original, also includes acoustic covers of such hits as "Heartbeats" by his fellow Swedes The Knife, "Love Will Tear Us Apart" by Joy Division, "Born in the U.S.A." and "The Ghost of Tom Joad" by Bruce Springsteen, "Hand on Your Heart" by Kylie Minogue, "Smalltown Boy" by Bronski Beat, "Teardrop" by Massive Attack and "Last Snowstorm of the Year" by Low.

His second album, In Our Nature, was released internationally on 22 September 2007.  The album's lyrical content was in part influenced by his reading of books like The God Delusion by evolutionary biologist Richard Dawkins and Practical Ethics by ethicist Peter Singer. In 2007, González won a European Border Breakers Award Award. Every year the European Border Breakers Awards (EBBA) recognize the success of ten emerging artists or groups who reached audiences outside their own countries with their first internationally released album in the past year.

In 2010, a documentary about González called The Extraordinary Ordinary Life Of Jose Gonzalez was released. In December 2014, González performed at the sustainable lifestyle festival, Wonderfruit in Thailand.

His album Vestiges & Claws was released in February 2015. It was critically acclaimed and received the IMPALA Album of the Year Award.

On 17 February 2021, he released a single with Spanish lyrics, "El Invento". In April he released "Visions", the second single from his album Local Valley, which was released on 17 September.

Television and other media appearances

González has performed on several television programs, including Late Night with Conan O'Brien (29 March 2006 and 28 September 2007), Jimmy Kimmel Live! (12 October 2007), the BBC's Later... with Jools Holland (9 June 2006), Last Call with Carson Daly (21 June 2006), Seven Network's Sunrise (15 August 2007) and Canada's MTV Live (5 December 2007).

The song "Crosses", from González's Crosses EP and the Veneer album, appeared on the finale of the second season of the popular American television comedy drama The O.C., as well as on a trailer for a BBC Four programme. It also appeared in the video game Life Is Strange. Also taken from the Veneer album, "Stay in the Shade" was used in The O.C., midway through season three, in the episode The Pot Stirrer. The song "Storm," also from Veneer, was used in season 1 episode called "Best Laid Plans" in the Friday Night Lights TV series (12 December 2006).

His cover of The Knife's "Heartbeats" has been used many times. It featured in a Sony BRAVIA commercial featuring 250,000 coloured bouncing balls in San Francisco;  in episode 409 and 505 of the CW's One Tree Hill and is included on the album The Road Mix: One Tree Hill Volume 3; it featured in season 7, episode 2 of Scrubs; in season 1, episode 21 of Brothers & Sisters; in season 4, episode 17 of Bones; in Stargate Universe; in 90210; in season 1, episode 21 of Whitney; and in an episode of the British TV show; Sun, Sea and A+E. Gone, a 2007 film directed by Ringan Ledwidge, and Kyss Mig, a 2011 film directed by Alexandra Therese Keining, both feature the track "Lovestain", from the Veneer album.

Music from González' latest album has also been used in other television shows. His version of Massive Attack's "Teardrop" was used in the fourth season finale of House entitled "Wilson's Heart" (the Massive Attack version is used as the show's theme music). It features in the fifth-season episode of Numb3rs entitled "The Fifth Man". The song can be heard at the end of Friday Night Lights season 4, episode "A Sort of Homecoming".

González features prominently on the soundtrack to Ben Stiller's "The Secret Life of Walter Mitty", whether with Junip or by himself, including choir-backed opener "Step Out", "Stay Alive" and similarly lush John Lennon cover "#9 Dream".

His original song "Far Away" appeared in the Western video game Red Dead Redemption by Rockstar Games. The song's Western music feel garnered "Best Song" at Spike Video Game Awards for its featured appearance, the game itself took home the award for "Game of the Year".

Collaborations 

González plays in the band Junip with Tobias Winterkorn (and previously Elias Araya). To date Junip have released two EPs, Black Refuge and the free internet release Rope and Summit, along with two full-length albums, Fields and Junip.

He collaborated with UK downtempo duo Zero 7 on their 2006 album, The Garden, providing guest vocals on the album's tracks, along with Zero 7 regular Sia. González performs vocals on four songs: "Futures", "Left Behind", "Today" and "Crosses". His song "Crosses" is featured in the popular video game Life Is Strange.

González collaborated with Finnish house DJ Jori Hulkkonen on the track "Blinded By The Numbers" from Hulkkonen's album Dualizm, released in 2005, and his song 'Crosses' was sampled by British hiphop artist Plan B for the song "Cast a Light" which appears on the Paint It Blacker EP. He has also collaborated with the Swedish hip hop DJ and producer Embee on the track "Send Someone Away", the album mixed by Soundism received a Grammis. González's song "Crosses" was remixed in 2006 by popular Dutch DJ Tiësto. González can also be heard in the song "I want you Back" by the Swedish indie-rock group Niccokick.

González collaborated with The Books on Red Hot Organization's Dark Was the Night compilation album, fundraising for HIV and AIDS awareness, which was released in February 2009. In 2011, he contributed to the organization's follow-up album "Red Hot+Rio 2" with the song "Um Girassol Da Cor Do Seu Cabelo," recorded with Mia Doi Todd.

González participated in The Göteborg String Theory project in 2009–2011, an experimental music and art project that involved artists from Göteborg (Gothenburg), Sweden and classical composers from Berlin, Germany. A new sound piece of his song "Cycling Trivialities" was arranged by composer Nackt for a classical orchestra. It was recorded and performed together with González, and finally released on the album The Göteborg String Theory (Kning Disk) in April 2010. González continued his collaboration with The Göteborg String Theory in 2011. Nackt wrote 11 new arrangement for González' songs, and in spring 2011 José González and The Göteborg String Theory went on a European tour in 19 cites.

Personal life 
González is in a long-term relationship with his partner, Swedish designer Hannele Fernström, with whom he has a daughter born in 2017. González is an atheist and a "flexible" vegetarian.

A firm believer in effective altruism, since August 2017, González has been a member of Giving What We Can, a community of people who have pledged to give at least 10% of their income to charities.

Awards and honors 
 Manifestgalan, Singer-songwriter of the year
 Swedish Music Publishers Association (SMFF), Best Swedish songwriter of the year
 2004: Swedish Grammy, Best New Artist
 2006: European Border Breaker Award
 2007: Swedish government music export award for sales in 2006

Discography

Studio albums

Live albums

Extended plays

Singles

Notes

Other contributions
 Acoustic 05 (2005, Echo) – "Broken Arrows"
 Chillout Sessions 9 (2006, Ministry of Sound) – "Heartbeats"
 The Acoustic Album (2006, Virgin) – "Heartbeats"
 Acoustic 07 (2007, V2 Records) – "Lovestain"
 Chillout Sessions 10 (2007, Ministry of Sound) – "Down the Line"
 Chillout Sessions XI (2008, Ministry of Sound) – "Teardrop"
 Dark Was the Night (2009) – Featured on The Books cover of * Nick Drake's "Cello Song"
 Uncovered (2009, Ministry of Sound) – "Love Will Tear Us Apart"
 Red Dead Redemption Original Soundtrack (2010, Rockstar Games) – "Far Away"
 Record (2010, Zero 7) – "Futures – Feat. Jose Gonzalez"
 The Göteborg String Theory Album – Cycling Trivialities
 It All Starts with One (2011, Ane Brun) – "Worship"
 Soundtrack to The Secret Life of Walter Mitty (2013) – "Step Out", "Stay Alive", "#9 Dream"
 Master Mix: Red Hot + Arthur Russell  (2014, Yep Roc Records) – "This Is How We Walk On The Moon"
 Life Is Strange (2015, with his song "Crosses.")
 Looking for Alaska (2019) – "Crosses"

References

External links

 
 
 

1978 births
Living people
People from Gothenburg
English-language singers from Sweden
Musicians from Gothenburg
Swedish folk musicians
Swedish male singer-songwriters
Swedish singer-songwriters
Swedish atheists
Mute Records artists
Swedish indie rock musicians
Swedish people of Argentine descent
University of Gothenburg alumni
21st-century Swedish singers
21st-century Swedish male singers
Love Da Records artists